Anthony James Joseph Simonds-Gooding CBE (10 September 1937 – 16 October 2017) was marketing manager of the Birds Eye brand and later chief executive of British Satellite Broadcasting (BSB).

References 

1937 births
2017 deaths
Irish chief executives
Commanders of the Order of the British Empire